The 44th National Film Awards, was presented on 3 December 2020 by Ministry of Information, Bangladesh to felicitate the best of Bangladeshi films released in the calendar year 2019.

Lifetime Achievement

List of winners

References

External links

National Film Awards (Bangladesh) ceremonies
2019 film awards
2020 awards in Bangladesh